Igor Kolessov (born August 15, 1971 in Moscow) is a Russian sport shooter. He competed at the 2000 Summer Olympics in the men's 10 metre running target event, in which he placed seventh.

References

1971 births
Living people
Running target shooters
Russian male sport shooters
Shooters at the 2000 Summer Olympics
Olympic shooters of Russia